Am Stettiner Haff is an Amt in the district of Vorpommern-Greifswald, in Mecklenburg-Vorpommern, Germany. The seat of the Amt is in Eggesin.

Subdivision
The Amt Am Stettiner Haff consists of the following municipalities:

References

Ämter in Mecklenburg-Western Pomerania